Markland, also known as the Andrew Anderson House, is a historic mansion in St. Augustine, Florida. It was built in the Greek Revival style of Classical Revival architecture.

History
Construction on the original part of the coquina shellstone  mansion was begun by New York doctor Andrew Anderson Sr. in 1839, just prior to his death in a yellow fever epidemic. Anderson had first arrived in St. Augustine with his wife and two daughters in 1829.

A portion of the land east of the residence was sold by Dr. Andrew Anderson Jr., the son of Dr. Anderson Sr, in 1887 to Henry M. Flagler for construction of the Ponce de León Hotel.  Dr. Anderson Jr. died in 1924. The house was then purchased by the mayor of St. Augustine, Herbert E. Wolfe, who sold it to Flagler College in 1966.

Present day
The Markland House is located at 102 King Street, down the street from the Ponce de León Hotel at 74 King Street. The house, still owned today by Flagler College, was added to the United States National Register of Historic Places on  December 6, 1978.

See also
National Register of Historic Places listings in St. Johns County, Florida

References

External links

 St. Johns County listings on the National Register of Historic Places
 Florida's Office of Cultural and Historical Programs
 St. Johns County listings at Florida's Office of Cultural and Historical Programs
 Markland House 
 Famous Floridians of St. Augustine

Houses in St. Johns County, Florida
Buildings and structures in St. Augustine, Florida
Houses on the National Register of Historic Places in Florida
National Register of Historic Places in St. Johns County, Florida
Greek Revival houses in Florida
Neoclassical architecture in Florida
Flagler College
1839 establishments in Florida Territory